Sedgefield is a coastal town on the Garden Route in the Western Cape province of South Africa. It is situated on the N2 national road, between George and Knysna.

The town was proclaimed in 1929 on the farm Sedgefield, which in turn was named in 1894 after the village of the same name in the UK where the father (Henry Barrington) of the then farm owner was born.

History
The farm Ruigtevlei was granted to the widow Meeding by Lord Charles Somerset and upon her death in 1878, the farm was divided into 9 lots. Lots A and B were first bought by individual farmers, before eventually being purchased in 1894 by John Barrington, son of then-famous politician, farmer and industrialist Henry Barrington (referred to as ‘Henry Barrington of Portland’ in the novel ‘Circles in a forest’ by Dalene Matthee). John named the town in honour of his father's birthplace Sedgefield in the United Kingdom.

Kate Maurice (née Barrington) inherited the farm Sedgefield from her brother upon his death in 1901. Kate sold the farm in 1911 to Salmon Terblans. A part of the farm Sedgefield was subsequently sold as Middelplaas, but was reincorporated in 1926. Terblans and Thomas Moodie investigated the possibility of proclaiming a town on the farm. Eventually, Moodie invested a lot of work into developing a town plan after securing an option to buy the farm but due to an oversight by Moodie's lawyer, Terblans was able to step back out of their agreement at the last moment and sell the ground to Thesen and Company. However, Charlie Thesen decided to compensate Moodie for his invested effort and allowed him to name the newly proclaimed town.

The name of Sedgefield was but one of a number of names considered by Moodie. In the end, the fact that it translated well to the original Afrikaans name of Ruigtevlei as well as the observation that it was very descriptive of the environment gave sway in favour of the name.

After proclamation, the town experienced organic growth by attracting families who were attracted by the ‘new winter resort’ advertised in the George and Knysna Herald from 1927 onwards. The first families to settle were the Salts, Schumachers, Browns, Barnards and Mullers. In 1921 a railway connection between George and Knysna was planned and the project was completed in 1928 by routing the line over a new bridge crossing the adjacent Swartvlei (‘Black lake’).  In 1940, the town was given a postal service outlet and in 1947 the road through Sedgefield was completed, thus fully integrating the town into the commercial route between George and Knysna.

A library was opened in 1962 and the town expanded further during the next four decades to comprise a central business district with supermarkets, pharmacies, filling stations, curio shops and other undertakings. Fresh water has been supplied from nearby Karatara River Municipal water extraction plant run by Sedgefield Municipality then Knysna Municipality, but being pressed by an unusually dry summer a desalination plant was erected in 2009 to make the town totally self-sufficient in terms of water supply.

Until the end of the 20th century, Sedgefield was an independent local authority.  When the ANC came to power nationally, for a variety of reasons, they decided to reduce the total of such local authorities country-wide and Sedgefield became part of Knysna.  This was a decision that was opposed by many of the residents.

Sedgefield today
The central area of Sedgefield (The Village) together with the Island (Extension 1) form part of the original town area. Since then, the extensions of Smutsville, Sizamile, Groenvallei, Myoli Beach and Cola Beach were added to provide residences for the approximately 8000 permanent inhabitants of Sedgefield.

The town's main economic activity revolves around tourism, with secondary activities centered on serving the needs of local residents and regional farmers. The laid-back rustic village atmosphere is reflected in the town's motto of being a place where ‘the tortoise sets the pace’. Sedgefield is the first African member of the Cittaslow movement. A popular attraction is the Wild Oats market which attracts large numbers of tourists and residents from the region every Saturday morning with fresh produce and local crafts. A golf course (the ‘Fynbos Links’), tennis court and bowls field caters to the significant portion of retired permanent residents of the town.

Local natural attractions include Gericke's lookout point which resembles the profile of a resting lion and the protected natural dune areas which harbours Cape Fynbos plantations and rare bird species.

Notable people
Demi-Leigh Nel-Peters – Miss Universe 2017

References

Populated places in the Knysna Local Municipality
Cittaslow